Si-Tahar Chérif El-Ouazzani (born 10 July 1967 in Oran) is a former Algerian footballer.

Career
Chérif El-Ouazzani started his career with hometown MC Oran in 1983. In his first season, he would lead the club to its first league title in 17 years. The following season he would lead the team to the final of the African Cup of Champions Clubs where they lost a controversial match-up on penalties to Raja Casablanca. He would play one more season for MCO during which he won the 1990 African Cup of Nations before signing his first professional contract with Turkish club Aydinspor, joining fellow Algerian Djamel Amani at the club. He played two season in Turkey before returning again to Algeria. The following year he would lead MC Oran to the league title for a second time before leaving again, this time to Moroccan side Raja Casablanca. After two trophy-less years in Morocco, he returned for a third stint with MCO. He would lead the team to the Algerian Cup in 1996 as well as back-to-back Arab Cup Winners Cups in 1997 and 1998. The following year they also won the Arab Super Cup defeating Syrian side Al Jaish in the final. He played with MCO until his retirement in 2002.

In 2003, he became coach of OM Arzew and was in control of the team until February 2008 when he was announced as the coach of MC Oran.

Personal life
Chérif El-Ouazzani is one of seven siblings, and his brother Abdennour Chérif El-Ouazzani is also a professional footballer. Chérif El-Ouazzani's son Hichem Chérif El-Ouazzani is also a professional footballer and international for Algeria.

Honours

Club
MC Oran
 Algerian Championship: 1988, 1993 ; Runner-up 1987, 1990, 1996, 1997, 2000
 Algerian Cup: 1984, 1985, 1996 ; Runner-up 1998, 2002
 Algerian League Cup: 1996 ; Runner-up 2000
 Arab Cup Winners Cup: 1997, 1998
 Arab Super Cup: 1999
 African Cup of Champions Clubs: Runner-up 1989
 Arab Club Champions Cup: Runner-up 2001

USM Bel Abbès
 Algerian Cup: 2018 (as a manager)

National
 Africa Cup of Nations: 1990
 Afro-Asian Cup of Nations: 1991

Individual
 African Footballer of the Year: Silver award 1990
 1990 African Cup of Nations: 2nd best player

References

External links 
 

1967 births
Living people
Footballers from Oran
Algerian footballers
Algeria international footballers
MC Oran players
Raja CA players
Aydınspor footballers
Süper Lig players
1990 African Cup of Nations players
1992 African Cup of Nations players
1996 African Cup of Nations players
Africa Cup of Nations-winning players
Algerian expatriate footballers
Expatriate footballers in Morocco
Expatriate footballers in Turkey
Algerian expatriate sportspeople in Morocco
Algerian expatriate sportspeople in Turkey
Algeria under-23 international footballers
Association football midfielders
Algerian football managers
MC Oran managers
ASM Oran managers
RC Arbaâ managers
Paradou AC managers
USM Bel Abbès managers
CR Belouizdad managers
RC Relizane managers
21st-century Algerian people